Fernando de Abreu (born 23 July 1906, date of death unknown) was a Brazilian rower. He competed in the men's eight event at the 1932 Summer Olympics.

References

External links

1906 births
Year of death missing
Brazilian male rowers
Olympic rowers of Brazil
Rowers at the 1932 Summer Olympics
Rowers from Rio de Janeiro (city)